An England cricket team toured Australia in 1873–74.  This was the third tour of Australia by an English team, the previous one being in 1863–64. The team is sometimes referred to as W. G. Grace's XI.

Squad
The team was captained by W. G. Grace (Gloucestershire) who was joined by Fred Grace, James Bush (both Gloucestershire); William Oscroft, Martin McIntyre (both Nottinghamshire); Harry Jupp, James Southerton, Richard Humphrey, Farrington Boult (all Surrey); Andrew Greenwood (Yorkshire); James Lillywhite (Sussex); W. R. Gilbert (Middlesex). The party consisted of five amateurs and seven professionals.

Tour
The team played 15 matches in Australia but none are recognised as a first-class fixture.

References

Further reading
 Derek Birley, A Social History of English Cricket, Aurum, 1999
 Chris Harte, A History of Australian Cricket, Andre Deutsch, 1993
 Simon Rae, W. G. Grace, Faber & Faber, 1999
 Richard Tomlinson, Amazing Grace: The Man Who Was W.G., Little, Brown, 2015

External links

1873 in Australian cricket
1873 in English cricket
1874 in Australian cricket
1874 in English cricket
1873
1873-74
International cricket competitions from 1844 to 1888